Bae Ho (Hangul: 배호; April 20, 1942 – November 7, 1971) was a South Korean singer, known as the "Elvis of Korean trot." A statue commemorating his biggest hit, "Turning around at Samgakji (돌아가는 삼각지)" stands in front of Samgakji Station in Seoul.

Early life
Bae was born Bae Sin-ung in Shandong, China, the son of Korean independence activist Bae Gook-min. He moved to what would become South Korea with his family in 1945 following the end of the Japanese occupation.

Career
Bae debuted as a singer in 1963. His popularity grew after the 1967 release of his song "Turning around at Samgakji" (Hangul: 돌아가는 삼각지), which topped music charts for five consecutive months. He ultimately released about 300 songs.

In 1966 he fell ill with nephritis and spent his last years battling the disease. He died in 1971.

References

1942 births
1971 deaths
Trot singers
20th-century South Korean male singers
People from Shandong